Riker Anthony Lynch (born November 8, 1991) is an American singer and actor. He was previously cast as Jeff, one of the members of the Dalton Academy Warblers singing group, on Fox's television series Glee. He finished in second place on season 20 of Dancing with the Stars with Allison Holker as his dance partner.

He was one of the lead singers and the bassist in R5 with his brothers Ross and Rocky, sister Rydel, and family friend Ellington Ratliff. He now has a band of his own called Riker and The Beachcombers.

Riker married Savannah Latimer on September 20, 2019.

Early life

Career

Acting
Riker was one of the Dalton Academy Warblers on Fox's hit show Glee. He was introduced as Jeff in the season 2 episode "Special Education", appearing thereafter as one of the Warbler singers in eleven more episodes through seasons 2, 3 and 4. He also appeared as a Warbler in the 2011 edition of the Glee Live! In Concert! tour, which performed from May through July 3, 2011 in the U.S., Canada, England and Ireland. A movie was filmed of the tour concert, which includes scenes with Riker performing as Jeff: Glee: The 3D Concert Movie was released on August 12, 2011. The film was released on DVD and Blu-ray on December 20, 2011 under the title Glee: The Concert Movie.

Music
Riker is the bassist and one of the lead vocalists in the band R5 with his family members Rocky, Rydel, and Ross also their best friend Ratliff. In April 2012, R5 announced via the band's website that they had signed a record deal with Hollywood Records and that they are planning for their first club tour in May. After the tour, R5 played numerous summer shows across the US and in Canada. In September two R5 songs were released on the Austin & Ally Soundtrack. R5 also came out with an EP called Loud on February 19, 2013. Their first full-length album, Louder, was released September 24, 2013. The album includes the four songs from the EP, and their single, "Pass Me By".

In 2022, he competed in NBC's American Song Contest, representing Colorado. He placed second at the grand final to AleXa.

Other ventures

On February 24, 2015, Lynch was announced as one of the celebrities who will participate on the 20th season of Dancing with the Stars. He was paired with professional dancer Allison Holker.
On May 19, 2015, Lynch and Holker finished the competition in second place, losing to actress Rumer Willis. He later returned during season 27 to be a trio partner to Milo Manheim and Witney Carson.

Filmography

Film

Television

Web

Discography

Singles

References

External links

 Official Website
 
 

21st-century American male actors
21st-century American singers
Male actors from Colorado
American bass guitarists
American male singers
American male television actors
Living people
Singers from Colorado
21st-century American guitarists
Guitarists from Colorado
R5 (band) members
American male bass guitarists
1991 births
American Song Contest contestants